Mnesiloba intentata is a moth of the family Geometridae first described by Francis Walker in 1866. It is known from Borneo, Java, Peninsular Malaysia, Luzon and New Guinea. The species was cited by George Hampson that, it is also found in Sri Lanka, but recent observations from the country reject the presence of the species from Sri Lanka.

Description
The wingspan is about 22 mm. Adults are green, irrorated (sprinkled) with black. The forewings have a slightly curved black subbasal line with two faint lines between it and the medial area, which is thickly irrorated with black, edged by black lines, and has three minutely waved black lines on it. The hindwings are pale fuscous.

References

Moths described in 1866
Eupitheciini